Drive is the fifth studio album by the Finnish gothic metal band Poisonblack. It was released on 27 April 2011 in Europe by Century Media Records.

Track listing 
All music and lyrics by Laihiala. All arrangements by Laihiala/Kanerva/Remes.

 Piston Head – 4:05
 Mercury Falling – 4:07
 A Good Day for the Crows – 4:24
 Maggot Song – 3:48
 From Now-Here to Nowhere – 6:10
 Sycophant – 3:49
 The Dead-End Stream – 3:29
 Futile Man – 6:21
 Scars – 5:07
 Driftwood – 3:29

Personnel 
Poisonblack
 Ville Laihiala – guitar, vocals
 Tarmo Kanerva – drums
 Antti Remes – bass
 Marco Sneck – keyboards

Session musician
 Anette Euesgaard – background vocals (tracks 1, 3 and 7)

Production
Tue Madsen – recording, mastering & engineering

References

Poisonblack albums
2011 albums